Nikolay Nikolov (born 4 June 1954) is a Bulgarian modern pentathlete. He competed at the 1976 and 1980 Summer Olympics.

References

1954 births
Living people
Bulgarian male modern pentathletes
Olympic modern pentathletes of Bulgaria
Modern pentathletes at the 1976 Summer Olympics
Modern pentathletes at the 1980 Summer Olympics